Komarikha is a rural locality (a settlement) in Parfyonovsky Selsoviet, Topchikhinsky District, Altai Krai, Russia. The population was 61 as of 2013. There are 2 streets.

Geography 
Komarikha is located 43 km southwest of Topchikha (the district's administrative centre) by road. Kirovskoye is the nearest rural locality.

References 

Rural localities in Topchikhinsky District